{{DISPLAYTITLE:C38H46F4N6O9S}}
The molecular formula C38H46F4N6O9S (molar mass: 838.865 g/mol) may refer to:

 Glecaprevir
 Telotristat ethyl

Molecular formulas